Murad Magomedkhabibovich Kurbanov (born 22 March 1992) is a former Russian footballer of Azeri ethnic origin.

Career
Murad Kurbanov made his professional debut for Anzhi Makhachkala on 14 July 2010 in the Russian Cup game against Pskov-747. He made his Russian Football National League debut for Anzhi on 30 May 2015 in a game against FC Sakhalin Yuzhno-Sakhalinsk.

External links
 
 
 

1992 births
Russian people of Dagestani descent
Russian sportspeople of Azerbaijani descent
Living people
Russian footballers
Association football defenders
FC Anzhi Makhachkala players
FC Khimik Dzerzhinsk players
NK Metalleghe-BSI players
Russian expatriate footballers
Expatriate footballers in Bosnia and Herzegovina